Hidvégardó is a village in Borsod-Abaúj-Zemplén County in northeastern Hungary. It contains the northernmost point of Hungary.

References

Populated places in Borsod-Abaúj-Zemplén County